Alex Mendham and His Orchestra are a British dance band, led by Alex Mendham, that performs and records music from the 1920s and 1930s.

They perform concerts internationally. The orchestra held a long standing residency at the Savoy Hotel in London.

Their debut album, Whistling in the Dark, was released in January 2013, followed by a second album, Jazznocracy, in December 2015.

In 2017 they released On with the Show, their third studio album.

On 1 September 2018, to mark the centennial of "I'm Forever Blowing Bubbles" debut in 1918, the orchestra performed a special arrangement of the song at the London Stadium, the current home of West Ham United F.C.

In 2020, the orchestra signed to Decca Records for a recording of "We'll Meet Again" backing Dame Vera Lynn in a tribute album entitled "Keep Smiling Through" released November 2020.

References

External links 
  Official website

Dance bands
Musical groups from London
Musical groups established in 2011
2011 establishments in the United Kingdom